Center Grove Community School Corporation is a school district located in Greenwood, Indiana.

It serves several portions of western Greenwood and most of Bargersville.

Schools

Center Grove High School
Center Grove Middle School Central
Center Grove Middle School North
Center Grove Elementary School
Walnut Grove Elementry School
Maple Grove Elementary School
North Grove Elementary School
Pleasant Grove Elementary School
Sugar Grove Elementary School

References

Education in Johnson County, Indiana
School districts in Indiana